The 1936 Texas A&M Aggies football team represented Texas A&M University during the 1936 college football season.

Schedule

References

Texas AandM
Texas A&M Aggies football seasons
Texas AandM